20th century in fashion may refer to:

1900s in fashion
1910s in fashion
1920s in fashion
1930–45 in fashion
1945–60 in fashion
1960s in fashion
1970s in fashion
1980s in fashion
1990s in fashion
History of fashion design